Karl Abt (18 December 1899, Pforzheim - 28 November 1985, Pforzheim) was a German painter.

Life
Abt began to paint at the age of 12 and, with the support of his parents, enrolled in the Pforzheim Kunstgewerbeschule. In 1917 Abt was called into military service, effectively ending his studies. After the end of World War I, he was apprenticed to a goldsmith. It was not until 1928 that he again began to study painting, at the Landeskunstschule in Karlsruhe. In 1935 he returned to Pforzheim and began working as a self-employed artist. He gained recognition primarily for his naturalistic landscapes and flower paintings.

Bibliography 
 Karl-Ludwig Hofmann, Alfred Hübner: 63 Künstler Innen. (In und aus Pforzheim. Volume 1.) Pforzheim 1992, pp. 8–10. (In German)

See also
 List of German painters

References

External links
 Karl Abt in Pforzheim's city wiki (In German)

20th-century German painters
20th-century German male artists
German male painters
People from Pforzheim
German landscape painters
1899 births
1985 deaths